The Columbian is a daily newspaper serving the Vancouver, Washington, and Clark County, Washington area. The paper was published for its first decade (1890–1900) as a four-page daily that was meant as a counterweight to the local Republican newspaper The Independent. Printer Tom Carolan began publication of The Vancouver Columbian on October 10, 1890. It successfully hedged out daily competition, such as the former Independent, to become the sole daily in the city today. A former weekly The Sun which published for 39 years prior to going daily; was absorbed by the Columbian and for a time the paper was published as The Vancouver Columbian and the Sun. It has been owned by the Campbell family since 1921; current president and publisher Ben Campbell is the fourth generation of the family to run the paper.  It is the newspaper of record for both Vancouver and Washougal.

Members of The Columbians editorial board are Scott Campbell, Jody Campbell, Ben Campbell, Craig Brown and Greg Jayne.

History

The Vancouver Columbian was first published as a weekly on October 10, 1890, before becoming a weekday paper on October 19, 1908. Herbert Campbell, great-grandfather of current publisher Ben Campbell, bought the paper in 1921. It occupied a series of offices in downtown Vancouver before building its own offices at what is now the northwest corner of Evergreen and Broadway in 1928. Relocating to larger headquarters in 1955, it published its first Sunday edition on August 6, 1972, its first Saturday edition on July 10, 1999, and changed from afternoon to morning delivery in July 2000.

The paper briefly relocated to new offices just south of Esther Short Park on January 13, 2008, but, citing declining revenue, relocated to their original building at 701 W. Eighth St. by December of the same year in an attempt to avert bankruptcy.

On May 1, 2009, The Columbian filed for Chapter 11 bankruptcy protection On February 5, 2010, the company emerged from bankruptcy. On June 10, 2010, the city of Vancouver purchased the former Columbian building and surrounding land downtown for $18.5 million from the Bank of America to become its new City Hall.

References

External links
Official website

Mass media in Vancouver, Washington
Newspapers published in Washington (state)
Newspapers established in 1890
1890 establishments in Washington (state)